Pirdad is a Mohallah in Hazro Tehsil of Attock District in Punjab Province of Pakistan.

Demographics
The population consists of Muslims and basic languages of region are Hindko and Pashto.

Notable people
Zubair Ali Zai

References

Villages in Attock District